Roger Federer was the two-time defending champion and successfully defended his title, defeating Andreas Seppi in the final, 7–6(7–1), 6–4.

Seeds

Draw

Finals

Top half

Bottom half

Qualifying

Seeds

Qualifiers

Qualifying draw

First qualifier

Second qualifier

Third qualifier

Fourth qualifier

References

 Main Draw
 Qualifying Draw

Gerry Weber Open - Singles
2015 Gerry Weber Open